Sarah Staudinger in an American fashion designer, entrepreneur, and founder of the fashion label STAUD. In 2019, she was named to the Forbes 30 Under 30 Arts & Style list.

Staudinger launched her brand STAUD with business partner George Augusto in 2015, and it grew substantially in 2018. The brand has been described as having a cult following; its accessory line has been particularly successful, launching popular items like the Moreau bucket bag as well as collaborations with New Balance and Birkenstock. Prior to STAUD, she was the fashion director at the brand Reformation. Earlier in her career, she worked as an assistant stylist.

Personal life 
A Los Angeles native, she was born to a Californian mother and a German father. Her mother and maternal grandfather also worked in the fashion business. Her godmother is Cher, a close friend of her mother.

In May 2022, Staudinger married Hollywood agent Ari Emanuel in Saint-Tropez; of note, the wedding was officiated by comedian Larry David, a friend of Emanuel.

References 

American fashion designers
Businesspeople from Los Angeles
American women fashion designers
21st-century American women
Living people
The New School alumni
1989 births